Bembecia vulcanica is a moth of the family Sesiidae. It is found on the Canary Islands.

The wingspan is about 22 mm.

The larvae feed on the flowers of Lotus campylocladus, Lotus hillebrandii and Psoralea bituminosa.

References

Moths described in 1969
Sesiidae
Moths of Africa